The 42nd Annual Grammy Awards were held on February 23, 2000, at the Staples Center in Los Angeles, California. They recognized accomplishments by musicians from the year 1999. Nominations were announced on January 4, 2000. Santana was the main recipient with eight Grammys, tying Michael Jackson's record for most awards won in a single night. Santana's album Supernatural was awarded a total of nine awards. American teen singers Britney Spears and Christina Aguilera were both nominated for Best New Artist, ultimately won by Aguilera.

Performers

Presenters
 Jennifer Lopez & David Duchovny - Best R&B Album
 Ray Benson, Clint Black & Lisa Hartman Black - Best Female Country Vocal Performance
 Martina McBride, Ray Romano & Kevin James - Best Country Album
 Melissa Etheridge, Sarah McLachlan & Sheryl Crow - Best New Artist
 Busta Rhymes, Jamie Foxx & Jane Krakowski - Best Female R&B Vocal Performance
 Mary J. Blige & 'NSync - Best Male Pop Vocal Performance
 Shirley Manson, Moby & Michael Clarke Duncan - Best Rap Performance by a Duo or Group
 Macy Gray, Phil Collins & Andy Williams - Song of the Year
 Vince Gill, Neil Young & Gloria Estefan - Record of the Year
 Bob Dylan & Lauryn Hill - Album of the Year

Award winners

General 
Record of the Year
"Smooth" – Santana featuring Rob Thomas
 Matt Serletic, producer; David Thoener engineer/mixer
"I Want It That Way" – Backstreet Boys
Kristian Lundin & Max Martin, producers; Kristian Lundin, Max Martin & Daniel Boom, engineers/mixers
 "Believe" – Cher
 Brian Rawling & Mark Taylor, producers; Mark Taylor, engineer/mixer
 "Livin' la Vida Loca" – Ricky Martin
 Desmond Child & Robi Rosa, producers; Craig Lozowick, German Ortiz, Nathan Malki & Charles Dye, engineers/mixers
 "No Scrubs" – TLC
 Kevin "She'kspere" Briggs, producer; Carlton Lynn & Leslie Brathwaite, engineers/mixers

Album of the Year
Supernatural – Santana
Carlos Santana, Clive Davis, Stephen M. Harris, Dante Ross, Matt Serletic, Lauryn Hill, Jerry Duplessis, Wyclef Jean, K. C. Porter, Fher Olvera, Alex González, Dust Brothers, Todd Ray, Art Hodge, Charles Goodan & J. B. Eckl, producers; Glen Kolotkin, Mike Couzzi, Jim Gaines, Ben Conrad, Steve Fontano, John Seymour, Andy Salas, Dave Dar, John Gamble, Steve Farrone, Michael Anderson, Tom Lord-Alge, Femio Hernandez, David Thoener, Andy Haller, Gordon "Commissioner Gordon" Williams, Tony Prendatt, Jamie Siegel, Warren Riker, Andy Grassi, Chris Theis, Chuck Bailey, Jason Groucott, Michael McCoy, Jeff Poe, John Karpowich, Adam Olmstead, Claudio Leiva, Tony Flores, Benny Faccone, Anton Pukshansky, David Frazer, Bill Kinsley, Billy Konkel, Tracey Brown, Todd Ray, Glen Kolotkin, Alvaro Villagra, Jim Scott, Matthew Spindel, Alejandro Cassini & Frank Rinella, engineers/mixers; Ted Jensen & Stephen Marcussen, mastering engineers
Millennium – Backstreet Boys
Kristian Lundin, Max Martin, Rami Yacoub, Robert John "Mutt" Lange, Stephen Lipson, Timmy Allen, Mattias Gustafsson, Edwin "Tony" Nicholas & Eric Foster White, producers; Kristian Lundin, Max Martin, Bo Reimer, Daniel Boom, Rami Yacoub, Chris Trevett, George Spatta, Adam Barber, Heff Moraes, Dawn Reinholtz, Devon Kirkpatrick, Mick Guzauski, Stephen George, Adam Blackburn, John Bates & Carl Robinson, engineers/mixers; Tom Coyne, mastering engineer
Fly – Dixie Chicks
Blake Chancey & Paul Worley, producers; Billy Sherrill, Christopher Rowe, Clarke Schleicher, Mark Martin, Tony Castle, John Guess & Patrick Murphy, engineers/mixers; Denny Purcell & Jonathan Russell, mastering engineers
When I Look in Your Eyes – Diana Krall
Tommy LiPuma, Johnny Mandel & David Foster, producers; Al Schmitt, Bill Smith, Koji Egawa, Anthony Ruotolo & Rory Romano, engineers/mixers; Doug Sax, mastering engineer
FanMail – TLC
Dallas Austin, Babyface, L.A. Reid, TLC, Kevin "She'kspere" Briggs, Jimmy Jam and Terry Lewis, Ricciano Lumpkins, Daryl Simmons, Jermaine Dupri, Carl So-Lowe & Debra Killings, producers; Alvin Speights, Vernon Mungo, Carlton Lynn, Leslie Brathwaite, "Jazzy Jeff" Griffin, Sejoon Kahng, Ty Hudson, Dylan Dresdow, Gordon Fordyce, Xavier Smith, Dave Rideau, Steve Hodge, John Horesco IV, Paul Boutin, Kevin Lively, Ralph Cacciurri, Thom Kidd, Jermaine Dupri, Phil Tan, Brian Frye, Aman Junaid, Ricciano Lumpkins, Jon Gass, E'lyk & Claudine Pontier, engineers/mixers; Herb Powers, mastering engineer

Song of the Year
"Smooth"
Itaal Shur & Rob Thomas, songwriters (Santana featuring Rob Thomas)
"I Want It That Way"
Andreas Carlsson & Max Martin, songwriters (Backstreet Boys)
"Livin' la Vida Loca"
Desmond Child & Draco Rosa, songwriters (Ricky Martin)
"Unpretty"
Dallas Austin & Tionne Watkins, songwriters (TLC)
"You've Got a Way"
Robert John "Mutt" Lange & Shania Twain, songwriters (Shania Twain)

Best New Artist
Christina Aguilera
Macy Gray
Kid Rock
Britney Spears
Susan Tedeschi

Pop 
Best Female Pop Vocal Performance
"I Will Remember You" – Sarah McLachlan
"Genie in a Bottle" – Christina Aguilera
"Beautiful Stranger" – Madonna
"Thank U" – Alanis Morissette
"...Baby One More Time" – Britney Spears

Best Male Pop Vocal Performance
"Brand New Day" – Sting
"I Need to Know" – Marc Anthony
"Mambo No. 5" – Lou Bega
"Sogno" – Andrea Bocelli
"Livin' la Vida Loca" – Ricky Martin

Best Pop Performance by a Duo or Group with Vocals
"Maria Maria" – Santana
"I Want It That Way" – Backstreet Boys
"Kiss Me" – Sixpence None the Richer
"All Star" – Smash Mouth
"Unpretty" – TLC

Best Pop Collaboration with Vocals
"Smooth" – Santana featuring Rob Thomas
"The Prayer" – Celine Dion & Andrea Bocelli
"When You Believe" – Whitney Houston & Mariah Carey
"Music of My Heart" – *NSYNC & Gloria Estefan
"Love of My Life" – Santana featuring Dave Matthews

Best Pop Instrumental Performance
"El Farol" – Santana
"The Look of Love" – Herb Alpert
"A Day in the Life" – Jeff Beck
"Song C" – Bruce Hornsby
"Night and Day" – Willie Nelson

Best Dance Recording
"Believe" – Cher
 "Don't Let This Moment End" – Gloria Estefan
 "Praise You" – Fatboy Slim
 "Waiting for Tonight" – Jennifer Lopez
 "I Will Go with You (Con te partirò)" – Donna Summer

Best Pop Album
Brand New Day – StingMillennium – Backstreet Boys
Believe – Cher
Ricky Martin – Ricky Martin
Mirrorball – Sarah McLachlan

Best Traditional Pop Vocal PerformanceBennett Sings Ellington: Hot & Cool – Tony BennettCome by Me – Harry Connick Jr.
The Movie Album: As Time Goes By – Neil Diamond
Manilow Sings Sinatra – Barry Manilow
You're the Top: Love Songs of Cole Porter – Bobby Short

 Rock 
Best Female Rock Vocal Performance "Sweet Child o' Mine" – Sheryl Crow"Bliss" – Tori Amos
"Jukebox" – Ani DiFranco
"Angels Would Fall" – Melissa Etheridge
"Possession" (Live) – Sarah McLachlan
Best Male Rock Vocal Performance"American Woman" – Lenny Kravitz"Can't Change Me" – Chris Cornell
"What It's Like" – Everlast
"The Promise" – Bruce Springsteen
"Hold On" – Tom Waits
Best Rock Performance by a Duo or Group with Vocal "Put Your Lights On" – Santana featuring Everlast"Special" – Garbage
"Black Balloon" – Goo Goo Dolls
"Malibu" – Hole
"Scar Tissue" – Red Hot Chili Peppers
Best Hard Rock Performance"Whiskey in the Jar" – Metallica"Get Born Again" – Alice in Chains
"Lit Up" – Buckcherry
"Bawitdaba" – Kid Rock
"Freak on a Leash" – Korn
"Nookie" – Limp Bizkit
Best Metal Performance"Iron Man" (Live) – Black Sabbath"Bad Blood" – Ministry
"Enter Sandman" – Motörhead
"Starfuckers, Inc." – Nine Inch Nails
"Superbeast" – Rob Zombie
Best Rock Instrumental Performance"The Calling" – Santana featuring Eric Clapton"What Mama Said" – Jeff Beck
"Espionage" – Green Day
"Bodyrock" – Moby
"Windows to the Soul" – Steve Vai
Best Rock Song"Scar Tissue"Flea, John Frusciante, Anthony Kiedis & Chad Smith, songwriters (Red Hot Chili Peppers)"Angels Would Fall"
John Shanks & Melissa Etheridge, songwriters (Melissa Etheridge)
"The Promise"
Bruce Springsteen, songwriter (Bruce Springsteen)
"Room at the Top"
Tom Petty, songwriter (Tom Petty and the Heartbreakers)
"Special"
Garbage, songwriters (Garbage)
Best Rock AlbumSupernatural – SantanaBreakdown – Melissa Etheridge
Significant Other – Limp Bizkit
Echo – Tom Petty and the Heartbreakers
Californication – Red Hot Chili Peppers
Best Alternative Music PerformanceMutations – BeckTo Venus and Back – Tori Amos
You've Come a Long Way, Baby – Fatboy Slim
Play – Moby
The Fragile – Nine Inch Nails

 R&B 
Best Female R&B Vocal Performance"It's Not Right but It's Okay" – Whitney Houston"All That I Can Say" – Mary J. Blige
"Almost Doesn't Count" – Brandy
"Love Like This" – Faith Evans
"Do Something" – Macy Gray
Best Male R&B Vocal Performance"Staying Power" – Barry White"Did You Ever Know" – Peabo Bryson
"When a Woman's Fed Up" – R. Kelly
"Fortunate" – Maxwell
"Sweet Lady" – Tyrese
Best R&B Performance by a Duo or Group with Vocal"No Scrubs" – TLC"Spend My Life with You" – Eric Benét featuring Tamia
"Don't Waste Your Time" – Mary J. Blige & Aretha Franklin
"Bills, Bills, Bills" – Destiny's Child
"Heartbreak Hotel" – Whitney Houston featuring Faith Evans & Kelly Price
Best R&B Song"No Scrubs"Kandi Burruss, Kevin "She'kspere" Briggs & Tameka Cottle, songwriters (TLC)"All That I Can Say"
Lauryn Hill, songwriter (Mary J. Blige) 
"Bills, Bills, Bills"
Kandi Burruss, Kevin "She'kspere" Briggs, Beyoncé Knowles, LeToya Luckett, LaTavia Roberson & Kelendria Rowland (Destiny's Child) 
"Heartbreak Hotel"
Carsten Schack, Kenneth Karlin & Tamara Savage (Whitney Houston) 
"It's Not Right but It's Okay"
LaShawn Daniels, Toni Estes, Fred Jerkins III, Rodney Jerkins & Isaac Phillips (Whitney Houston) 
Best R&B AlbumFanMail – TLCMary – Mary J. Blige
My Love Is Your Love – Whitney Houston
R. – R. Kelly
Back at One – Brian McKnight
Best Traditional R&B Vocal PerformanceStaying Power – Barry WhiteUnconditional Love – Peabo Bryson
Valence Street – The Neville Brothers
It's Harder Now – Wilson Pickett
Intimate – Smokey Robinson

Rap
Best Rap Solo Performance"My Name Is" – Eminem"Gimme Some More" – Busta Rhymes
"Vivrant Thing" – Q-Tip
"Wild Wild West" – Will Smith
"Changes" – 2Pac
Best Rap Performance by a Duo or Group"You Got Me" – The Roots featuring Erykah Badu"What's It Gonna Be?!" – Busta Rhymes featuring Janet Jackson
"Satisfy You" – Puff Daddy featuring R. Kelly
"Still D.R.E." – Dr. Dre featuring Snoop Dogg
"Guilty Conscience" – Eminem & Dr. Dre
Best Rap AlbumThe Slim Shady LP – Eminem; Jeff Bass, Marky Bass & Eminem, producers; Mr. B, engineer/mixerE.L.E. (Extinction Level Event): The Final World Front – Busta Rhymes; Robert Burnette, Busta Rhymes & Vinny Nicoletti, engineers/mixers
Da Real World – Missy "Misdemeanor" Elliott; Timbaland, producer; Jimmy Douglass & Timbaland, engineers/mixers
I Am – Nas; Rich Travali, engineer/mixer
Things Fall Apart – The Roots; The Grand Wizzards, producers; Keith Cramer, David Ivory & Axel Niehaus, engineers/mixers

 Country 
Best Female Country Vocal Performance
 "Man! I Feel Like a Woman!" – Shania Twain "Ordinary Heart" – Emmylou Harris
 "Let Me Let Go" – Faith Hill
 "Forget About It" – Alison Krauss
 "I Love You" – Martina McBride
Best Male Country Vocal Performance
 "Choices" – George Jones "Don't Come Cryin' to Me" – Vince Gill
 "That's Right (You're Not from Texas)" – Lyle Lovett
 "Please Remember Me" – Tim McGraw
 "Crazy Little Thing Called Love" – Dwight Yoakam
Best Country Performance by a Duo or Group with Vocal
 "Ready to Run" – Dixie Chicks "Honky Tonk Song" – BR549
 "Unbelievable" – Diamond Rio
 "Amazed" – Lonestar
 "Little Good-Byes" – SHeDAISY
Best Country Collaboration with Vocals
 "After the Gold Rush" – Emmylou Harris, Dolly Parton & Linda Ronstadt "(God Must Have Spent) A Little More Time on You" – Alabama featuring NSYNC
 "Going Away Party" – Asleep at the Wheel featuring The Manhattan Transfer & Willie Nelson
 "Roly Poly" – Asleep at the Wheel featuring Dixie Chicks
 "When I Said I Do" – Clint Black with Lisa Hartman Black
Best Country Instrumental Performance
 "Bob's Breakdowns" – Asleep at the Wheel featuring Tommy Allsup, Floyd Domino, Larry Franklin, Vince Gill & Steve Wariner "Black Mountain Rag" – Del McCoury, Doc Watson & Mac Wiseman
 "Mr. John Henry, Steel Driving Man" – Marty Stuart & Earl Scruggs
 "The Greatest Love of All Time (Reprise)" – Marty Stuart
 "The Harry Shuffle" – Steve Wariner
Best Country Song
 "Come On Over" Robert John "Mutt" Lange & Shania Twain, songwriters (Shania Twain) "Amazed"
 Marv Green, Chris Lindsey & Aimee Mayo, songwriters (Lonestar)
 "Choices"
 Mike Curtis & Billy Yates, songwriters (George Jones)
 "Ready to Run"
 Marcus Hummon & Martie Seidel, songwriters (Dixie Chicks)
 "Two Teardrops"
 Bill Anderson & Steve Wariner, songwriters (Steve Wariner)
Best Country Album
 Fly – Dixie Chicks Ride with Bob – Asleep at the Wheel
 Trio II – Emmylou Harris, Linda Ronstadt & Dolly Parton
 The Cold Hard Truth – George Jones
 Forget About It – Alison Krauss
Best Bluegrass Album
 Ancient Tones – Ricky Skaggs & Kentucky Thunder Bluegrass Mandolin Extravaganza – various artists
 The Mountain – Steve Earle & Del McCoury Band
 The Bluegrass Sessions: Tales from the Acoustic Planet, Vol. 2 – Béla Fleck
 I Feel Like Singing Today – Jim Lauderdale, Ralph Stanley & the Clinch Mountain Boys

 New Age 
Best New Age AlbumCeltic Solstice – Paul WinterCitizen of the World – David Arkenstone
Turning – Suzanne Ciani
Inside Monument Valley – Paul Horn & R. Carlos Nakai
Inner Voices – R. Carlos Nakai
Plains – George Winston

 Jazz 
Best Contemporary Jazz Performance
 Inside – David Sanborn Ethnomusicology, Vol. 1 – Russell Gunn
 Animation/Imagination – Tim Hagans
 Joy Ride – Bob James
 Yin-Yang – Victor Wooten

Best Jazz Vocal Performance
 When I Look in Your Eyes – Diana Krall It's All About Love – Carla Cook
 Heart of a Woman – Etta James
 Bridges – Dianne Reeves
 Traveling Miles – Cassandra Wilson

Best Jazz Instrumental Solo
 "In Walked Wayne" – Wayne Shorter "Straight Up and Down" – Gary Burton
 "Wigwam" – Chick Corea
 "There Is No Greater Love" – Stefon Harris
 "In Vogue" – Chris Potter

Best Jazz Instrumental Performance, Individual or Group
 Like Minds – Gary Burton, Chick Corea, Pat Metheny, Roy Haynes & Dave Holland Change – Chick Corea & Origin
 Requiem – Branford Marsalis Quartet
 Art of the Trio 4: Back at the Vanguard – Brad Mehldau
 Inner Voyage – Gonzalo Rubalcaba

Best Large Jazz Ensemble Performance
 Serendipity 18 – Bob Florence Far East Suite – Anthony Brown's Asian American Orchestra
 Time's Mirror – Tom Harrell
 Epiphany – Vince Mendoza
 Inspiration – Sam Rivers' Rivbea All-Star Orchestra

Best Latin Jazz Performance
 Latin Soul – Poncho Sanchez Tumbao Para Los Congueros Di Mi Vada – Al McKibbon
 Latin Jazz Explosion – Bobby Rodriguez
 Antiguo – Gonzalo Rubalcaba & Cuban Quartet
 Briyumba Palo Congo-Religion of the Congo – Chucho Valdés

 Gospel 
Best Rock Gospel AlbumPray – Rebecca St. JamesUnderdog – Audio Adrenaline
Choose Life – Big Tent Revival
I Can See Clearly Now – Gospel Gangstaz
Time – Third Day

Best Pop/Contemporary Gospel AlbumSpeechless – Steven Curtis ChapmanAnointed – Anointed
The Gift of Christmas – Andraé Crouch
Gloryland – Dukes of Dixieland
The Prince of Egypt (Nashville) – Various artists

Best Southern, Country or Bluegrass Gospel AlbumKennedy Center Homecoming – Bill Gaither & Gloria GaitherA Glen Campbell Christmas – Glen Campbell
Roy Clark Sings & Plays Gospel Greats – Roy Clark
Winding Through Life – Doyle Lawson & Quicksilver
The Final Sessions – J. D. Sumner & The Stamps

Best Traditional Soul Gospel Album
Christmas with Shirley Caesar – Shirley Caesar

Best Contemporary Soul Gospel Album
Mountain High...Valley Low – Yolanda Adams

Best Gospel Choir or Chorus Album
High and Lifted Up – Carol Cymbala (choir director), performed by the Brooklyn Tabernacle Choir

Blues
Best Traditional Blues AlbumBlues on the Bayou – B.B. King
Best Contemporary Blues Album
Take Your Shoes Off – The Robert Cray Band

Children's
Best Musical Album for Children
Andy Hill (producer) for The Adventures of Elmo in Grouchland performed by various artists
Best Spoken Word Album for Children (music producer)
Steven Epstein, David Frost (producers), Graham Greene, Kate Winslet & Wynton Marsalis for Listen to the Storyteller

Comedy
From 1994 through 2003, see "Best Spoken Comedy Album" under the "Spoken" field, below.

Classical
Best Orchestral Performance
Michael Tilson Thomas (conductor), the Peninsula Boys Choir, the San Francisco Girls Chorus & the San Francisco Symphony Orchestra & Chorus for Stravinsky: Firebird; The Rite of Spring; Perséphone
Best Classical Vocal Performance
Claudio Abbado (conductor), Anne Sofie von Otter, Thomas Quasthoff & the Berliner Philharmonic for Mahler: Des Knaben Wunderhorn
Best Opera Recording
Nicholas Parker (producer), John Eliot Gardiner (conductor), Ian Bostridge, Anne Sofie von Otter, Bryn Terfel, Deborah York, the Monteverdi Choir & the London Symphony Orchestra for Stravinsky: The Rake's Progress
Best Choral Performance
Robert Shafer (conductor), Betty Scott, Joan McFarland (choir directors), the Maryland Boy Choir, the Shenandoah Conservatory Chorus & the Washington Chorus for Britten: War Requiem
Best Instrumental Soloist(s) Performance (with orchestra)
Charles Dutoit (conductor), Martha Argerich & the Montreal Symphony Orchestra for Prokofiev: Piano Concertos Nos. 1 & 3/Bartók: Piano Concerto No. 3
Best Instrumental Soloist Performance (without orchestra)
Vladimir Ashkenazy for Shostakovich: 24 Preludes & Fugues, Op. 87 
Best Small Ensemble Performance (with or without conductor)
Joseph Jennings (conductor) & Chanticleer for Colors of Love - Works of Thomas, Stucky, Tavener & Rands
Best Chamber Music Performance
Anne-Sophie Mutter & Lambert Orkis for Beethoven: The Violin Sonatas (Nos. 1–3, Op. 12; Nos. 1–3, Op. 30; "Spring" Sonata)
Best Classical Contemporary Composition
Pierre Boulez (composer) & the Ensemble Inter-Contemporain for Boulez: Répons
Best Classical Album
Andreas Neubronner (producer), Michael Tilson Thomas (conductor), the Peninsula Boys Choir, the San Francisco Girl's Chorus & the San Francisco Symphony Orchestra & Chorus for Stravinsky: Firebird; The Rite of Spring; Perséphone
Best Classical Crossover Album
The Chestnut Brass Company & Peter Schickele for Schickele: Hornsmoke (Piano Concerto No. 2 in F Major "Ole"); Brass Calendar; Hornsmoke - A Horse Opera

Composing and arranging
Best Instrumental Composition
Don Sebesky (composer) for "Joyful Noise Suite"
Best Song Written for a Motion Picture, Television or Other Visual Media
Madonna & William Orbit (songwriters) for "Beautiful Stranger" performed by Madonna
Best Instrumental Composition Written for a Motion Picture, Television or Other Visual Media
Randy Newman (composer) for A Bug's Life
Best Instrumental Arrangement
Don Sebesky (arranger) for "Chelsea Bridge"
Best Instrumental Arrangement Accompanying Vocalist(s)
Alan Broadbent (arranger) for "Lonely Town" performed by the Charlie Haden Quartet West featuring Shirley Horn

Film/TV/media
Best Soundtrack Album
Tarzan – Mark Mancina & Phil CollinsAmerican Beauty – 
Austin Powers: The Spy Who Shagged Me – 
The Matrix – 
The Prince of Egypt – 
Best Song Written for a Motion Picture, Television or Other Visual Media
"Beautiful Stranger" (from Austin Powers: The Spy Who Shagged Me) – Madonna & William Orbit, songwriters (Madonna)
"Music of My Heart" (from Music of the Heart) – Diane Warren, songwriter (NSYNC & Diane Warren)
"The Prince of Egypt (When You Believe)" (from The Prince of Egypt) – Steven Schwartz & Babyface, songwriters (Mariah Carey & Whitney Houston)
"The Time of Your Life" (from A Bug's Life) – Randy Newman, songwriter (Randy Newman)
"You'll Be in My Heart" (from Tarzan) – Phil Collins, songwriter (Phil Collins)
Best Instrumental Composition Written for Motion Picture or TelevisionA Bug's Life - Randy Newman
Shakespeare in Love - Stephen Warbeck
Star Wars Episode I: The Phantom Menace - John Williams
Le Violon Rouge - John Corigliano
La Vita è Bella - Nicola Piovani

Folk
Best Traditional Folk Album
Press On - June Carter CashBest Contemporary Folk AlbumMule Variations - Tom WaitsHistorical
Best Historical Album
Orrin Keepnews (producer), Steven Lasker (producer & engineer), Paul Brizzi & Dennis Ferrante (engineers) for The Duke Ellington Centennial Edition - The Complete RCA Victor Recordings (1927 - 1973)

Latin
Best Latin Pop Performance
Rubén Blades for Tiempos
Best Traditional Tropical Latin Performance
Tito Puente for Mambo Birdland
Best Mexican-American Performance
Plácido Domingo for 100 Años de Mariachi
Best Latin Rock/Alternative Performance
Chris Perez Band for Resurrection
Best Tejano Performance
Los Palominos for Por Eso Te Amo
Best Salsa Performance
Los Van Van for Llego...Van Van - Van Van Is Here
Best Merengue Performance
Olga Tañón for Olga Viva Viva Olga

Musical show
Best Musical Show Album
John McDaniel, Stephen Ferrera (producers) & the New Broadway cast with Bernadette Peters & Tom Wopat for Annie Get Your Gun

Music Video
Best Short Form Music Video
 "Freak on a Leash" – Korn
 Terry Fitzgerald, Bart Lipton (video producers); Graham Morris, Todd McFarlane, Jonathan Dayton and Valerie Faris (video directors)
 "All Is Full of Love" – Bjork
 Cindy Bulmar (video producer); Chris Cunningham (video director)
 "Everything Is Everything" – Lauryn Hill
 John Oloen (video producer); Sanji (director)
 "Back at One" – Brian McKnight
 Heather Jansson (video producer); Francis Lawrence (director)
 "Unpretty" – TLC
 Kati Haberstock (video producer); Paul Hunter (director)

Best Long Form Music VideoBand of Gypsies - Live at Fillmore East – Jimi Hendrix
Chips Chipperfield & Neil Aspinall (video producers), Bob Smeaton (video director)

Packaging and notes
Best Recording Package
Buddy Jackson, Ray Benson & Sally Carns (art directors) for Ride With Bob performed by Asleep at the Wheel 
Best Boxed Recording Package
Arnold Levine & Ron Jaramillo (art directors) for Miles Davis - The Complete Bitches Brew Sessions performed by Miles Davis
Best Album Notes
Bob Blumenthal (notes writer) for John Coltrane - The Classic Quartet: Complete Impulse! Studio Recordings performed by John Coltrane

Polka
Best Polka Album
Polkasonic - Brave Combo

Production and engineering
Best Engineered Album, Non-Classical
Al Schmitt (engineer) for When I Look in Your Eyes performed by Diana Krall
Best Engineered Album, Classical
Markus Heiland (engineer), Michael Tilson Thomas (conductor), the Peninsula Boys Choir, the San Francisco Girl's Chorus & the San Francisco Symphony Orchestra & Chorus for Stravinsky: Firebird; The Rite of Spring; Perséphone
Producer of the Year, Non-Classical
Walter Afanasieff
Producer of the Year, Classical
Adam Abeshouse
Remixer of the Year, Non-Classical
Club 69 (Peter Rauhofer)

Reggae
Best Reggae Album
''Calling Rastafari - Burning SpearRoots Revival - Aswad
The Doctor - Beenie Man
Living Legacy - Steel Pulse
Generation Coming - Third World

Spoken
Best Spoken Word Album
LeVar Burton for The Autobiography of Martin Luther King, Jr.
Best Spoken Comedy Album
Chris Rock for Bigger & Blacker

World
Best World Music AlbumLivro'' - Caetano Veloso

Special merit awards

MusiCares Person of the Year
Elton John

The 42nd GRAMMY LOGO
The design of the 42nd GRAMMY AWARDS logo, was commissioned to Mark Deitch and Associates. The actual design was conceived and executed by Raoul Pascual of WYNK Marketing. Michael Green of the Recording Academy stipulated that the logo should encompass all forms of musical genre and (whatever the design) the GRAMMY logo had to be prominently featured. Raoul's concept was to represent music with some of its major instruments:  the clarinet for woodwinds, the piano for percussion, the guitar for strings plus a microphone:

"I imagined all the instruments emanating from behind the logo. My problem was how to translate that into a visual. I designed black and white icons of the instruments using a vector program. I was working overtime and I was getting desperate. I was moving the different icons around the GRAMMY logo but none of the combinations seemed to work. As I picked up the guitar icon, I decided to pray and make a deal with God. I said 'if you bless me with a winning design, I will give you the glory every time I share how I designed the GRAMMY logo.' Suddenly, I inadvertently released my hold of the icon and it fell on top of the GRAMMY logo. I stared at the image on my screen and I saw my solution. I added the other icons and curved them to suggest movement from behind. Eureka! That was it!"

With suggestions from the staff and the people at the Recording Academy in the course of several weeks, the design underwent an evolution from a 2 dimensional rendering into 3D.

References

 042
2000 in American music
2000 in California
2000 music awards
2000 in Los Angeles
2000 awards in the United States
February 2000 events in the United States